The Global Center for Health Innovation, also known as the Medical Mart, is a $465 million joint venture by Cuyahoga County and MMPI to construct a permanent showroom of medical, surgical and hospital goods along with a new Huntington Convention Center of Cleveland in downtown Cleveland, Ohio. Construction of the project on the historic Mall began May 2011 after being funded by a decades long 0.25% sales tax increase passed by Cuyahoga County commissioners in 2007. The Medical Mart concept is modeled after that of the Merchandise Mart in Chicago, and was initially managed by MMPI, the same company that operates the Merchandise Mart. SMG was scheduled to assume management of the Global Center on November 15, 2013. As of November 2019, the center has remained mostly vacant since its completion, much of the space in the upper floor has been converted to meeting rooms, and it expected to move away from its medical focus as its largest tenants pull out.

The center is attached to the Hilton Cleveland Downtown Hotel.

References

External links 

Buildings and structures in Cleveland
Healthcare in Cleveland
Health care companies based in Ohio
Downtown Cleveland